Dorian Harper is a defender and midfielder who plays for P.C. United FC in the Montserrat Championship

Career
He played for Montserrat national team three times once coming on as a sub his most recent appearance came in 2010 for the WCQ.He is also the second youngest ever montserratian make his national team debut at 21 and 202 days.

References

Living people
Montserrat international footballers
Montserratian footballers
1982 births
Association football midfielders